Po Tisuntiraidapuran (?–1793) was the ruler of Champa from 1780 to 1793. His Vietnamese name was Nguyễn Văn Tá (阮文佐).

Po Tisuntiraidapuran was a descendant of Po Saktiraydapatih. He was appointed the ruler of Champa with the title cai cơ by Nguyễn lord. Since 1771, Champa was a victim of Vietnamese civil war. The fate of Champa was dependent on outcome of the civil war between the Tây Sơn dynasty and the Nguyễn lords. Po Tisuntiraidapuran turned to support Tây Sơn rebels in 1782. He was regarded as a traitor by Nguyễn Ánh. In 1788, Nguyễn Ánh appointed Po Krei Brei (Nguyễn Văn Chiêu) and Po Ladhuanpuguh (Nguyễn Văn Hào) as co-rulers of Champa.

In 1793, Po Tisuntiraidapuran was defeated and captured by Po Ladhuanpuguh. He was executed in Gia Định (present-day Ho Chi Minh City). Since then, Champa rulers did not use the title Thuận Thành trấn phiên vương (順城鎮藩王, "Vassal king of Thuận Thành trấn"); Champa was regarded as a chiefdom under Vietnamese thổ ty system.

In the history record Archives royales du Champa, there were two documents related to him.

References

Kings of Champa
1793 deaths
Year of birth unknown
People executed by Vietnam